Kate Connor may refer to:

 Kate Connor (Terminator) (née Brewster), fictional character from the Terminator films
 Kate Connor (Coronation Street), fictional character from Coronation Street played by Faye Brookes

See also
 Kate O'Connor (disambiguation)